Eropterus is a genus of net-winged beetles in the family Lycidae. There are about 10 described species in Eropterus.

Species
These 10 species belong to the genus Eropterus:
 Eropterus arculus Green, 1951
 Eropterus aritai (Sato & Ohbayashi, 1968)
 Eropterus bilineatus Green, 1951
 Eropterus flavipennis (Nakane, 1969)
 Eropterus glebulus
 Eropterus masumotoi Matsudai, 2011
 Eropterus ohkurai Matsuda
 Eropterus rectus Green, 1951
 Eropterus taiwanus Matsuda
 Eropterus trilineatus (Melsheimer, 1846)

References

Further reading

External links

 

Lycidae
Articles created by Qbugbot